Sasha Skenderija (born 4 July 1968) is a Bosnian-American poet currently residing in Prague.

Biography

Skenderija began publishing poetry, prose and criticism in Bosnian (Serbo-Croatian) in the late 1980s, graduating from the University of Sarajevo in 1991. After surviving six months of the siege of Sarajevo, he fled to Prague, where he received a Ph.D. in Information Science from Charles University (1997). In 1999, with the help of translator and Cornell University linguistics professor Wayles Browne, Skenderija arrived in Ithaca, New York. He relocated to New York City in 2010 and lived in Astoria, Queens. He now lives in Prague, Czech Republic while working for the Czech National Library of Technology.

Skenderija is one of the most renowned Bosnian poets born since 1960, and his work confronts a range of experience, from the quotidian to the polemical, while pushing the boundaries of the genre. He ranks among the Bosnian poets with the most English-language reviews.

Works

Books of poetry (Bosnian)

 Golo O
 Kako naslikati žar-pticu
 Ništa nije kao na filmu
 Praški fraktali
 Zašto je patuljak morao biti ustrijeljen
 Rt Dobre Nade

Books of poetry (English translation)

 Why the Dwarf Had to be Shot.
 Cape of Good Hope

Poems in Anthologies

His poetry has been included in several Bosnian and Croatian anthologies and translated into Czech, English, Macedonian and Slovenian:

 Prague Tales: A Collection of Central European Contemporary Writing,
 Absinthe, New European Writing,
 There is Less and Less Space: Panorama of the Newest Bosnian Poetry (in Bosnian),
 Scar on the Stone: Contemporary Poetry from Bosnia,
 Conan Lives Here: Young Bosnian Poetry 1992-1996 (in Croatian),
 Messages from the Bottom of the Night: Literature of Bosnia and Herzegovina under Siege and in Exile (in Czech),
 The Passion of Difference/Dark Sound of Emptiness: Croatian Poetry of the 1990s (in Croatian)

English translations of his poems have also been included in:

 Balkan Visions and Silver Visions II,
 Witness
 Like a Fragile Index of the World: Poems for David Skorton
 Spirit of Bosnia
The City That Never Sleeps: Poems of New York

Skenderija also contributed lyrics to three albums of the cult Sarajevo techno-industrial band SCH (VRIL, 2002; Eat This!, 2004; and Dance, 2007).

References

External links

 Author's web site
 Reading excerpt from Prague Fractals (link to video)
 Sasha Skenderija on Google Scholar

1968 births
Living people
People from Vitez
Bosnia and Herzegovina poets
Bosnia and Herzegovina writers
Bosnia and Herzegovina emigrants to the United States
Charles University alumni
University of Sarajevo alumni